Lemuel Benton (1754May 18, 1818) was an American planter and politician from Darlington County, South Carolina. He represented South Carolina in the United States House of Representatives from 1793 until 1799. Colonel Benton resided on Stoney Hill Farm, located in Darlington County near Mechanicsville.

References

External links
Biographic sketch at U.S. Congress website

1754 births
1818 deaths
Members of the South Carolina House of Representatives
Democratic-Republican Party members of the United States House of Representatives from South Carolina